Degagah or Dagagah, also rendered as Degaga, may refer to:
 Degagah, Saqqez
 Degagah, Sarvabad